Sygic is a Slovak company of global automotive navigation systems for mobile phones and tablets. The company was founded in 2004 and is headquartered in Bratislava, Slovakia. It became the first company to offer navigation for iPhone and second for Android. In 2015 Sygic reached milestone of 100 million downloads of its navigation app.

History 
The company was founded in 2002
 by Michal Štencl, Martin Kališ, and Peter Pecho with Michal Štencl serving as company CEO since then.

In 2009 Sygic became the first company worldwide to offer GPS navigation for iPhone.

In 2015 company reached milestone of 100 million downloads of its navigation app.

In 2016 Sygic made an acquisition of Czech startup Tripomatic to expand its services to travel planning and travel management.

Overview 

Sygic navigation systems work on mobile phones and tablets with GPS and use screen and audio signals to provide door-to-door information for well-oriented travel, live traffic & police radar/speed camera warnings, parking place, and gas prices suggestions.

Sygic GPS navigation focuses on its wide usability. It can be used both online and offline, runs on Android, Android Auto, iOS, Windows Phone and Symbian operating systems, offers maps for more than 200 countries in the world and operates in more than 30 languages.

Sygic navigation uses 2D & 3D maps from TomTom for both online and offline use.

Users of Sygic GPS navigation can download maps to their devices and use them when they need navigation but have no internet connection. Sygic optimizes data download sizes to allow users to use maps offline while using the minimum amount of memory on their devices.

Sygic delivers its GPS software worldwide in more than 30 languages, including Chinese, Arabic, Persian, Greek, Russian and many European languages. In 2016 Sygic created a translation project on Crowdin "dedicated to localization of Sygic app to all languages". Project localization is open to the public that can contribute to Catalan, Urdu, Persian, Malay, Tamil, Latvian and other languages.

Real-time traffic information is based on TomTom Traffic. Traffic information is collected from more than 400 million drivers and updated every 2 minutes. "GPS data is collected from connected personal navigation devices (PNDs), commercial fleet GPS devices, mobile phone signals, road sensors, journalistic data, smartphones and car dashboard systems." Users do not report anything - the data is collected automatically and anonymously.

Privacy 
NRK (Norwegian national broadcasting service)  published a report about Sygic sharing data with data brokers like Gravy Analytics, part of Ventell for purposes like fraud detection, law enforcement, and national security. GDPR is setting strict limits and requirements for what companies can do with users' personal information. According to lawyers, this is in violation of the GDPR. However, neither Gravy Analytics nor Ventell are partners of Sygic, and there is no proof of the fact that the source of the data referred to was Sygic.

Awards
Sygic has been cited by Deloitte as the:
 6th Technology Fastest-growing Technology Company in Central & Eastern Europe for the years 2007 and 2008
 2nd Technology Fastest-growing Technology Company in Central & Eastern Europe for the year 2009
 3rd Technology Fastest-growing Technology Company in Central & Eastern Europe for the year 2010 and #143 in EMEA

Additionally, there are:
 Global Champion Award 2021 awarded by the Emerging Europe Platform
 Superbrands Slovakia Award 2021 from Superbrands Brand Council
 Top CES (Consumer Electronics Show) Innovation Award 2020 for Real-time Traffic Lights in Sygic GPS Navigation
 Innovation Radar Prize 2018 for Sygic’s intelligent routing algorithm

Memberships
 Coalition for App Fairness
 CharIN Association

See also 
 Point of Interest
 Comparison of commercial GPS software
 Garmin

References
 sygic.com

Navigation system companies
Slovak brands